Joseph Charles Dennison (February 2, 1888 – September 21, 1958) was a Canadian professional ice hockey player. Born in Ottawa, Ontario, Dennison played his first professional season of 1908–09 mostly with the Duquesne Athletic Club of the Western Pennsylvania Hockey League. In 1911, he signed with the Ottawa Senators of the National Hockey Association. He appeared in 14 games for the Senators during the span of the 1911–12 and 1912–13 seasons. Later, he worked for the Bell Telephone Company, retiring in 1945 due to his health. He died at his home in Ottawa in 1958 of heart disease.

References

External links
Joe Dennison at JustSportsStats

1888 births
1958 deaths
Duquesne Athletic Club players
Ice hockey people from Ottawa
Ottawa Senators (NHA) players
Canadian ice hockey centres